May 4th Square is a transfer station on Line 2 and Line 3 of the Qingdao Metro. It opened on 18 December 2016.

Gallery

References

Qingdao Metro stations
Railway stations in China opened in 2016